Ranfurly is a hamlet in central Alberta, Canada within the County of Minburn No. 27. Previously an incorporated municipality, Ranfurly dissolved from village status on January 1, 1946 to become part of the Municipal District of Birch Lake No. 484.

Demographics 

Climate

See also 
List of communities in Alberta
List of designated places in Alberta
List of former urban municipalities in Alberta
List of hamlets in Alberta

References 

Hamlets in Alberta
Designated places in Alberta
Former villages in Alberta
County of Minburn No. 27